Flatow is a surname. Notable people with the surname include:

 Alfred Flatow (1869–1942), German gymnast
 Alisa Flatow (1974–1995), American student and terrorism victim
 Curth Flatow (1920-2011), German dramatist and screenwriter 
 Evan Flatow (born 1956), American orthopaedic surgeon
 Fred Flatow (born 1937), Australian-German chess master
 Gustav Flatow (1875–1945), German gymnast
 Ira Flatow (born 1949), radio and television journalist, NPR
 Stephen Flatow (born 1948) American lawyer and father of terrorism victim Alisa Flatow